Fred L. Henley (October 25, 1911December 31, 1994) was a judge on the Missouri Supreme Court from 1964 until 1978, and the chief justice of that same court from 1969 to 1971.

Henley was appointed to the court by Governor John M. Dalton, to a seat vacated by the death of Justice Frank Hollingsworth. Prior to his appointment, he was the chairman of the state highway commission.

Sources

1911 births
Chief Justices of the Supreme Court of Missouri
1994 deaths
20th-century American judges
People from Caruthersville, Missouri
Judges of the Supreme Court of Missouri
Cumberland University alumni